Pablo Thiago Ferreira Thomaz (born 7 September 1999), known as Pablo Thomaz, is a Brazilian footballer who plays as a forward.

Club career

Coritiba
Born in Ribeirão Preto, São Paulo, Pablo Thomaz joined Coritiba's youth setup in December 2014, aged 15. He made his first team debut on 11 June 2018, starting in a 1–1 Série B away draw against Juventude.

After spending the entire 2019 campaign featuring only with the under-20 and under-23 squads, Pablo Thomaz was loaned to Red Bull Brasil on 6 January 2020. He scored his first senior goal while on loan at the club, netting the game's only in a 1–0 home success over São Caetano on 12 February.

In October 2020, Pablo Thomaz was recalled by Coxa, and was assigned back to the main squad now in the Série A. He made his debut in the category on 4 October, coming on as a late substitute for Gabriel in a 1–1 home draw against São Paulo.

On 24 July 2021, after again being rarely used, Pablo Thomaz terminated his contract with Coritiba.

Santos
On 29 July 2021, Pablo Thomaz signed for Santos, being initially assigned to the under-23 squad. On 30 December, he was loaned to Paraná until the end of the 2022 Campeonato Paranaense.

Career statistics

References

External links

1999 births
Living people
People from Ribeirão Preto
Brazilian footballers
Association football forwards
Campeonato Brasileiro Série A players
Campeonato Brasileiro Série B players
Campeonato Brasileiro Série D players
Coritiba Foot Ball Club players
Red Bull Brasil players
Santos FC players
Paraná Clube players
Footballers from São Paulo (state)